The 2009 Western Michigan Broncos football team represented Western Michigan University in the 2009 NCAA football season.  The WMU football team was coached by Bill Cubit and played their home games in Waldo Stadium in Kalamazoo, Michigan.  WMU finished the season 5–7, defeating fellow Mid-American Conference (MAC) members Buffalo, Eastern Michigan, Miami and Toledo, Football Championship Subdivision team  and losing to rival Central Michigan, Kent State, Northern Illinois, Ball State, Big Ten Conference members Indiana, Michigan and Michigan State.

Senior running back Brandon West set NCAA and MAC records for career all-purpose yards and career kick return yards during the week-four game against Hofstra.  West passed Miami running back Travis Prentice for all-purpose yards (6,111) and Eastern Michigan's Trumaine Riley for kick return yards (2,541). West also currently holds the National Collegiate Athletic Association record for active career record holder for all-purpose yards, kick return yards and kick returns.

2008 summary

Western Michigan finished the 2008 season 9–4 overall and 6–2 in the Mid-American Conference.  WMU finished tied for second in the West Division, defeating Big Ten Conference member Illinois and Western Athletic Conference member Idaho in the non-conference portion of the schedule. WMU participated in the Texas Bowl, losing to Rice 38–14. Over the course of the season, the Broncos received votes in both the AP Poll and the USA Today Coaches' Poll.

Schedule

Game summaries

Michigan

Michigan, 13 point favorites, scored 14 points in the first quarter and 17 in the second to lead 31–0 at halftime.  WMU scored in the fourth quarter on a 73-yard touchdown pass from Tim Hiller to Juan Nunez to avoid the shutout.  WMU outpassed Michigan 263 yards to 197, but only gained 38 yards on the ground.

Hiller finished the game 22 of 38 for 259 yards with one touchdown and two interceptions.  WMU turned the ball over three times on the day, leading to seven Michigan points.

On defense, linebacker Austin Pritchard led the team with 13 tackles and a forced fumble.

Recap | Boxscore

Indiana

Recap | Boxscore

Miami

Recap | Boxscore

Hofstra

Recap | Boxscore

Northern Illinois

Recap | Boxscore

Toledo

Recap | Boxscore

Central Michigan

Recap | Boxscore

Buffalo

Recap | Boxscore

Kent State

Recap | Boxscore

Michigan State

Recap | Boxscore

Eastern Michigan

Recap | Boxscore

Ball State

Recap | Boxscore

Awards

Mid-American Conference Player of the Week
 Jamail Berry, S
 Week 3 (Defense) – Recovered a fumble for a touchdown, one interception and a blocked PAT in 48–26 win over Miami. On the game's first play from scrimmage, Berry recovered a fumble and returned it 24 yards for the opening score. He recorded his first career interception on Miami's third possession. Berry blocked the PAT attempt in the third quarter.
 Week 11 (Defense) – Five tackles, career-high two interceptions and one recovered fumble in a 35–14 win at Eastern Michigan.
 Austin Pritchard, LB
 Week 2 (Defense) – Blocked fourth quarter field goal, game-high 12 tackles.
 Week 4 (Defense) – Recorded ten tackles, two tackles for loss and a sack in 24–10 win over Hofstra.
 Brandon West, RB / KR
 Week 6 (Offense) – Rushed for 153 yards and three touchdowns. Also threw for a touchdown pass in a 58–26 win vs. Toledo. West finished the game with 236 all-purpose yards.
 Week 8 (Special teams) – Gained 108 return yards, 282 all-purpose yards and two rushing touchdowns in 34–31 overtime win over Buffalo.
 Week 10 (Special teams) – Recorded 142 kick return yards and 262 all-purpose yards in a 49–14 loss against Michigan State.  During the game, West set the NCAA Division I FBS record for kick return yards in a career.  West broke the record of 2,945 return yards set by Jessie Henderson of SMU.
 Week 11 (Special teams) – Two kick returns for 43 yards and 183 all-purpose yards to set the NCAA Division I FBS record for career all-purpose yards in 35–14 win at Eastern Michigan.

Finalists
 Tim Hiller, QB – Wuerffel Trophy

Watch lists
 Ben Armer, P – Ray Guy Award
 Tim Hiller, QB – Davey O'Brien Award, Lowe's Senior CLASS Award, Manning Award, Walter Camp Award 
 Austin Pritchard, LB – Lombardi Award
 Brandon West, RB – Doak Walker Award

Coaching staff
 Bill Cubit – Head coach
 Steve Morrison – Defensive coordinator, linebackers
 Ryan Cubit – Quarterbacks
 Tim Daoust – Defensive secondary
 Mike Grant – Wide receivers
 Rick Kravitz – Safeties
 Peter McCarthy – Defensive line
 Jake Moreland – Tight ends
 Mike Sabock – Running backs, special teams
 Bob Stanley – Offensive line
 Tim Knox – Director of football operations
 Brent Bassham – Defensive graduate assistant
 Matt Ludeman – Offensive graduate assistant

References

Western Michigan
Western Michigan Broncos football seasons
Western Michigan Broncos football